Gákti is a piece of traditional clothing worn by the Sámi in northern areas of Norway, Sweden, Finland and the Kola Peninsula in Russia. The gákti is worn both in ceremonial contexts and while working, particularly when herding reindeer. The traditional Sami outfit is characterized by a dominant color adorned with bands of contrasting colours, plaits, pewter embroidery, tin art, and often a high collar. In the Norwegian language the garment is called a 'kofte', and in Swedish it is called 'kolt'.

Characteristics
The colours, patterns and decorations of the costume can signify a person's marital status and geographical origin. There are different gákti for women and men; men's gáktis are shorter at the hem than women's. Traditionally the gákti was made from reindeer skin, but in modern times, wool, cotton or silk are more common. The gákti can be worn with a belt (pleated, quilted or with silver buttons), silver jewellery, traditional leather footwear and a silk scarf. Traditionally, if the buttons on the belt are square, it shows the wearer is married. If they are round, the person is unmarried. If a married couple divorce, and the ex-husband still continues to use the Sami costume made by his ex-wife, he states by this that he wants her back.

In other Sámi languages 
"Gákti" is the Northern Sámi term for the clothing. Other terms are also used in other Sami languages:

South Sámi:  gaeptie/gapta/gåptoe

Ume Sámi:  gápttie

Pite Sámi:  gáppte, gåppto

Lule Sámi:  gáppte/gábdde

Inari Sámi: mááccuh

Skolt Sámi: määccaǩ

Kildin Sámi: ма̄цэх/юххьп/юппа

Fake gákti
The Finnish tourist industry is notorious for displaying fake "sami culture" for tourists. Ethnically Finnish actors dress up in fake "gáktis" and perform fake "traditional rituals". This activity has been met with fierce protests from ethnic Sámi since it creates a false image of Sámi culture, diverts tourist industry money from ethnic Sámi to ethnic Finns (thereby exploiting the Sámi presence in Lappland without giving anything back to the Sámi) and is dishonest towards tourists.

See also
 Four winds hat
 Luhkka
 Beaska

References
Fra hverdagsplagg til kulturelt kjennetegn Norwegian Digital Learning Arena / Norwegian News Agency 

Sámi clothing
Sámi-language terms
Norwegian clothing
Finnish clothing
Russian clothing